I Know Leopard are an Australian pop band from Sydney, New South Wales. The band was formed in 2012, and features Luke O'Loughlin on vocals and keyboards, Rosie Fitzgerald on bass and Jennifer McCullagh on violin and keyboards. They released their debut album, Love is a Landmine, in 2019.

History
The band was formed in 2012 between friends Luke, Matt, Jade and Todd, after they relocated from Adelaide to Sydney. Soon after they released their debut EP, Embers.

In 2014, the band signed to Ivy League Records, through which they released their second EP, Illumina. Shortly after this, the band saw the arrival of Jennifer and the departure of Jade. The EP saw success on triple j, and the band won the Sydney slot for the 2015 Laneway Festival Unearthed competition.

In 2015, the lineup changed once again with the departure of Matt and the arrival of Rosie. Later in the year, the band released their third EP, Another Life. The songs "Close Your Eyes", "Perfect Picture" and "Another Life" all received significant airplay on Triple J. The band released the singles "Rather Be Lonely" and "Let Go" in 2016 and 2017, respectively, with both singles also receiving strong airplay on triple j.

In 2018, the band released the song "Landmine", which would later come in at #177 on the triple j Hottest 200. The following year, the band released the singles "Heather" and "Seventy Lies", and in April 2019 they released their debut album Love is a Landmine. The album debuted and peaked at #39 on the ARIA Charts. The album was also nominated for the Australian Music Prize, and received Album of the Week at Sydney Community Radio station FBi Radio. The fourth single from the album, "Everything Goes With You", was released in August 2019 and was a nominee for the 2019 Vanda & Young Global Songwriting Competition.

In 2019, O'Loughlin and Fitzgerald announced that they had been in a romantic relationship for a few years. This relationship, and the breakdowns that happened around it, aided in the creation of music for their debut LP Love is a Landmine, which O'Loughlin described as "therapy".

Todd Andrews left the band in 2020 to focus on his other band, These New South Whales.

In 2021, the band returned with a new single, "Lover Automatic". This was followed later in the year with a further two stand-alone singles, "Day 2 Day" and "Good As What You Give".

Touring 
The band have embarked on several national tours over the years, including the Love is a Landmine album tour in mid 2019 selling out and playing to thousands of people across Australia, and the "Everything Goes With You" national tour in November 2019, named after a song from the band's debut album. The band have played a number of notable festivals, including  Lost Lands, Festival of the Sun and Beyond the Valley in 2019 and Party in the Paddock in 2020. The band supported A-ha and Rick Astley in February 2020.

Musical style 
When the band originated, their sound was a blend of indie rock and dream pop. Later in their career, the band began to shift their sound towards more synth-based art pop and indie pop, as well as drawing upon 1970's era style soft rock.

Members

Current members
Luke O'Loughlin – lead vocals, keyboards (2012–present)
Jennifer McCullagh – violin, keyboards, backing vocals (2013–present)
Rosie Fitzgerald – bass, synthesizer, backing vocals (2015–present)

Past members
Matt DeGris – drums (2012–2015)
Jade Eley – bass, backing vocals (2012–2013)
Todd Andrews – guitar (2012–2020)

Touring musicians
Jack Moffitt – guitar
Luke Davison – drums
Tully Ryan – drums

Discography

Albums

EPs

Singles

Awards and nominations

National Live Music Awards
The National Live Music Awards (NLMAs) are a broad recognition of Australia's diverse live industry, celebrating the success of the Australian live scene. The awards commenced in 2016.

|-
| rowspan="2"| National Live Music Awards of 2019
| Rosie Fitzgerald (I Know Leopard)
| Live Bassist of the Year
| 
|-
| Jennifer McCullagh (I Know Leopard)
| Live Instrumentalist of the Year
| 
|-

References

External links

Musical groups established in 2012
Australian indie pop groups
Musical groups from Sydney
2012 establishments in Australia